Waskhaqucha (Quechua waskha (also waska) rope, qucha lake, also spelled Huascacocha) or Wask'aqucha (Quechua wask'a rectangle) is a lake in Peru located in the Junín Region, Tarma Province, San Pedro de Cajas District. Waskhaqucha lies southeast of Chinchayqucha and northeast of a smaller lake named Pukaqucha, north of the village of Patakancha.

References 

Lakes of Peru
Lakes of Junín Region